Santhosh Damodharan is an Indian film producer, distributor and actor who predominantly works in the Malayalam film industry. He owns the production house Damor Cinema. He is best known for producing Pakalppooram (2002), Chandrolsavam (2005), and Kurukshetra (2008).  Damodharan made his acting debut as the lead antagonist in Krishnankutty Pani Thudangi (2021).

Filmography

As producer

As an actor
 Kurukshetra (2008)
 Krishnankutty Pani Thudangi (2021)

References

External links

Malayalam film producers
Living people
1965 births